New York City R&B  is a 1961 free jazz album originally recorded at a session by bassist Buell Neidlinger but subsequently reissued under joint names with the pianist Cecil Taylor.

Reception 

Writing for AllMusic, Scott Yanow commented: "The music is quite advanced for the period, although more accessible to the average listener than Taylor's later recordings; one can hear, even in abstract form, his connection to the bebop tradition and to Duke Ellington."

Track listing 
 "O.P." (Buell Neidlinger) - 9:15
 "Cell Walk for Celeste" [Take 8] (Cecil Taylor) - 11:38
 "Cindy's Main Mood" (Billy Higgins, Neidlinger, Taylor) - 5:14
 "Things Ain't What they Used to Be" [Take 1] (Mercer Ellington) - 10:07
 Recorded at Nola's Penthouse Sound Studios, NYC, January 9 & 10, 1961

Personnel 
 Cecil Taylor - piano
 Buell Neidlinger - bass
 Archie Shepp - tenor saxophone
 Clark Terry - trumpet
 Steve Lacy - soprano saxophone
 Roswell Rudd - trombone
 Charles Davis - baritone saxophone
 Denis Charles - drums
 Billy Higgins - drums

References 

1972 albums
Cecil Taylor albums
Candid Records albums
Albums produced by Nat Hentoff
Columbia Records albums
Buell Neidlinger albums